Meuma is a Loloish language spoken in Xinzhai 新寨, Mada Village 马达村, Daping Township 大坪镇, Malipo County, Yunnan. There are several semi-fluent elderly speakers, with no fluent speakers left.

The Meuma are also called Mengwu 孟武 by the Han Chinese (Malipo County Gazetteer 麻栗坡县志 (2000)).

Classification
Meuma is most closely related to Samu, Sanie, and Katso of central Yunnan, thus belonging to Lama's Kazhuoish branch (Hsiu 2013, 2017).

References

Sources 
Hsiu, Andrew. 2013. New endangered Tibeto-Burman languages of southwestern China: Mondzish, Longjia, Pherbu, and others. Presented at ICSTLL 47, Dartmouth College. 

Loloish languages